Yago Fernando da Silva, known as Yago (born August 29, 1992 in São Paulo), is a Brazilian professional footballer who plays as a centre back for Náutico.

Career

Youth and loans
Yago was part of Portuguesa's youth squad before moving over to Corinthians. He was loaned to Marília in 2012 and made his professional debut with the team. He returned to Corinthians in 2013 and was part of the squad that won the 2013 Campeonato Paulista. He was eventually loaned again, this time to Bragantino, where he played in the Brasileirão Série B of the same year, as well as the 2014 Campeonato Paulista, 2014 Brasileirão Série B and 2014 Copa do Brasil.

Corinthians

2015 season
He returned to Corinthians in January, 2015, and was part of the main squad for the 2015 Campeonato Paulista and 2015 Copa Libertadores. He played a total of 8 games during the Campeonato Paulista, all of them as a part of the starting team as Corinthians mixed its players during the competition. He scored his first goal against Penapolense on 26 March in a 5–3 victory at Arena Corinthians.

Career statistics

Honours
Corinthians
Campeonato Paulista: 2013
Campeonato Brasileiro Série A: 2015

Botafogo
 Campeonato Carioca: 2018

Náutico
Campeonato Pernambucano: 2021

References

1992 births
Living people
Brazilian footballers
Clube Atlético Bragantino players
Sport Club Corinthians Paulista players
Clube Náutico Capibaribe players
Campeonato Brasileiro Série A players
Association football defenders
Footballers from São Paulo